Parliamentary elections were held in Bulgaria on 25 June 2005, for the 240 members of the National Assembly. According to exit polls, the Socialists had a lead with around 31%, but without a majority, necessitating the creation of a coalition. The National Movement for Simeon II, in power before the election, was in second place, with around 21%. Following the election, Socialist Party leader Sergei Stanishev became Prime Minister.

At least 6,000 candidates (from 22 parties) ran for election to the 240 member parliament. The turnout of 56% was the lowest on record. 4% of the votes are needed to gain a seat.

The opposition led the election, but did not gain an outright majority. Sergei Stanishev, leader of the socialist party, stated he would attempt to form a governing coalition. "We won the confidence of the people ... We are ready to form a government ... and we will negotiate with any democratic party," Stanishev said in a press conference.

In the last five free elections held since 1989, no government has been re-elected—each has had to implement stringent economic and social reforms, since the fall of communism, and has lost popular support as a result.

For a political analysis of the 2005 parliamentary elections see Europe and the Parliamentary Elections in Bulgaria, 25 June 2005 published by the European Parties Elections and Referendums Network.

Results

Aftermath

As no one party received a majority in the Assembly the Socialists were faced with the task of putting together a coalition government. The Socialists faced many difficulties when trying to establish a coalition as all of the other political parties that had crossed the 4% threshold in the parliament were to the right of the Socialists, meaning compromise would be needed to ensure a workable coalition agreement. The Socialists tried to form a coalition of the three largest parties: themselves, the NDSV, and the DPS. However, while they gained the support of the DPS, they failed to gain the support of the NDSV. While the Socialists tried to enter into a two party minority government with DPS as their coalition partner, this was rejected by parliament when despite voting for Sergei Stanishev to be prime minister in a close 120-119 vote the parliament voted against his proposed cabinet. As per the constitution the mandate to form a government was passed to the next largest political party, NDSV. However, on August 11, NDSV announced that they had decided to reject the offer due to the "complicated political situation," this then lead to the third largest party, DPS to receive the mandate to try and form a coalition government, finally after talks with the leaders of the two largest parties Ahmed Dogan, leader of the DPS was able to form a coalition agreement between the Socialists, NDSV and his own DPS. Sergei Stanishev leader of the socialists was elected prime minister and the coalition held 169 seats in the 240 seat parliament.

References

External links

Parliamentary elections in Bulgaria
Bulgaria
Parliamentary